The 2009–10 Maryland Terrapins women's basketball team will represent the University of Maryland, College Park in the 2009–2010 NCAA Division I basketball season. The Terps will be coached by Brenda Frese. The Terps are a member of the Atlantic Coast Conference.

Offseason
May 5: Maryland, 31-5 last season, will welcome a Big Ten team to College Park for the first time since hosting Ohio State in the 2007 Big Ten/ACC Challenge. The Terrapins upended the Buckeyes, 77-53, and followed that up with a road win at Purdue in the 2008 Challenge for a 2-0 record in the event. On December 3, the Terrapins will host the University of Minnesota.
May 15: University of Maryland head coach Brenda Frese announced that assistant coach Erica Floyd has decided to step down from her post as assistant coach of the Terrapins women's basketball team and will pursue other opportunities outside of coaching in Louisiana.

Regular season
The Terrapins will compete in the Terrapin Classic on December 27 and 29.

Roster

Schedule

Atlantic Coast tournament

Player stats

Postseason

Women's National Invitational Tournament
The Terps were selected for the Women's NIT tournament, and fell to Providence College in the third round after defeating Iona College in round 1 and East Carolina University in round 2.

Awards and honors

Team players drafted into the WNBA

Tianna Hawkins, Seattle Storm #6 overall

See also
2009–10 ACC women’s basketball season
List of Atlantic Coast Conference women's basketball regular season champions
List of Atlantic Coast Conference women's basketball tournament champions

References

External links
Official Site

Maryland Terrapins women's basketball seasons
Maryland
2009 in sports in Maryland
2010 in sports in Maryland